Børge Bastholm Larsen (3 January 1931 – 16 July 1960) was a Danish footballer who played as a defender for Køge Boldklub. He made eleven appearances for the Denmark national team from 1954 to 1959.

References

External links
 
 

1931 births
1960 deaths
People from Svendborg
Danish men's footballers
Association football defenders
Denmark international footballers
Denmark youth international footballers
Denmark under-21 international footballers
Køge Boldklub players
Footballers killed in the 1960 Danish football air crash
Sportspeople from the Region of Southern Denmark